The Dugandan railway line was a branch railway in the Scenic Rim region of South East Queensland, Australia. It was also known as the Fassifern railway line. It operated from 1882 to 1964.

Geography 
The line began west of Ipswich station on the Main Line 39 km west of Brisbane and proceeded generally southward for approximately 50 km to the locality of Dugandan now part of the urban settlement of Boonah.

History 
Residents in the Fassifern Valley petitioned the Queensland Government to build a railway line to their district, and the first section was opened on 10 July 1882 as far as Harrisville. This is considered to be Queensland's first branch railway. The branch was extended to Dugandan on 12 September 1887.

The Mount Edwards branch line branched off the Dugandan line at Munbilla. The Mount Edwards line opened to Kalbar on 17 April 1916 and to Mount Edwards on 7 October 1922. The Mount Edwards line closed in 1960.

During its life, the Dugandan branch carried mixed traffic, including goods trains, mixed trains and rail motors.

The Dugandan branch was closed beyond the Churchill railway station on 30 June 1964 due to increasing competition from road transport. The small remaining section was known as the Churchill branch railway.

Route

Legacy 

There is a memorial to the railway line in Yeates Street, Boonah at the back of the Commercial Hotel. The memorial is on the site of the former Boonah railway station.

Some evidence of the line's existence remains today. An embankment which carried the railway over a floodplain immediately north of Boonah is still readily visible from the Boonah-Fassifern Road. The station building at Harrisville is still intact, as is a small cutting immediately south of Harrisville station. Part of the alignment between Boonah and Dugandan along a cut-and-fill embankment is now a paved footpath through an urban park.

As of 2009, the Scenic Rim Region is developing a rail trail in partnership with the Queensland state government. The trail for the use of bushwalkers, cyclists and horse riders will follow some of the former alignment between Ipswich and Boonah.

Gallery

See also

Rail transport in Queensland

References

External links

 1925 map of the Queensland railway system

Railway lines opened in 1882
Closed railway lines in Queensland
South East Queensland
1964 disestablishments in Australia
1882 establishments in Australia
Railway lines closed in 1964